Zeyar or Ziar or Ziyar may refer to:
 Ziar, Golestan
 Ziar, Isfahan
 Zeyar, Mazandaran
 Ziyar, after whom the Ziyarid dynasty was named by one of his sons